The 2018 Winton SuperSprint was a motor racing event for the Supercars Championship, held on 18-20 May 2018. The event was held at the Winton Motor Raceway near Benalla, Victoria and consisted of two races, 120 and 200 kilometres in length. It was the sixth round of sixteen in the 2018 Supercars Championship and hosted Races 13 and 14 of the season.

Results

Practice

Race 13

Qualifying

Race 

 Notes
 – Simona de Silvestro received a total of 20-second post-race Time Penalty for Careless Driving, 5-second for causing contact with Nick Percat and 15-second for causing contact with Lee Holdsworth.

Championship standings after Race 13 

Drivers Championship

Teams Championship

 Note: Only the top five positions are included for both sets of standings.

Race 14

Qualifying

Race 

 Notes
 – James Courtney received a 15-second Time Penalty for Careless Driving, causing contact with Garth Tander.

Championship standings after Race 14 

Drivers' Championship standings

Teams Championship

 Note: Only the top five positions are included for both sets of standings.

References

Winton SuperSprint
Winton SuperSprint